Ouro Verde (Portuguese for "green gold") is a municipality in the state of São Paulo in Brazil. The population is 8,620 (2020 est.) in an area of 267 km². The elevation is 350m.

The municipality contains part of the  Rio do Peixe State Park, created in 2002.

References

Municipalities in São Paulo (state)